Tulsi Ramsay (29 July 1944 – 13 December 2018) was an Indian film director. He was the son of F. U. Ramsay and was one of the famous Seven Ramsay Brothers. The other six are Kumar Ramsay, Shyam Ramsay, Keshu Ramsay, Arjun Ramsay, Gangu Ramsay and Kiran Ramsay. Tulsi Ramsay directed several movies in the Horror genre during the 80's and 90's. Movies such as Hotel, Purana Mandir, Tahkhana, Veerana, Bandh Darwaza have acquired a cult following. He has also directed the Zee Horror Show TV series in 1993. The memories of most of the episodes of this TV series are still afresh in the hearts of horror enthusiasts in India. He ran a production company, Tulsi Ramsay Production located at Andheri in Mumbai.  Ramsay died on 14 December, 2018 in a city hospital in Mumbai after complaining of chest pains.

Filmography

Director 

 The Zee Horror Show (1993) TV series (unknown episodes)
 Mahakaal (1993)
 Police Mathu Dada (1991)
 Inspector Dhanush (1991)
 Ajooba Kudrat Ka (1991)
 Bandh Darwaza (1990)
 Purani Haveli (1989)
 Veerana (1988)
 Tahkhana (1986)
 Telephone (1985)
 Saamri (1985)
 Purana Mandir (1984)
 Ghungroo Ki Awaaz (1981)
 Hotel (1981)
 Sannata (1981)
 Dahshat (1981)
 Saboot (1980)
 Guest House (1980)
 Aur Kaun? (1979)
 Darwaza (1978)
 Andhera (1975)
 Do Gaz Zameen Ke Neeche (1972) ... aka Two Yards Under the Ground (India: English title)
 Nakuli Shaan (1971)
 Penanggalan (1967) ... aka The Headless Terror (USA) [widely dismissed as a hoax]

Producer 

 Aatma (2006)
 Bandh Darwaza (1990)
 Tahkhana (1986)
 3D Saamri (1985)

Production Designer 

 Bandh Darwaza (1990)
 Na-Insaafi (1989)
 Purana Mandir (1984)

Writer 

 Inspector Dhanush (1991) (story) (Credited as Tulsi-Shyam)

References 

 Fear on Film : The Ramsay Brothers and Bombay’s Horror Cinema - Karthik Nair

External links 
 

20th-century Indian film directors
1944 births
2018 deaths
Indian production designers
Hindi-language film directors
Indian television directors
Hindi film producers
20th-century Indian designers
Artists from Karachi